The following radio stations broadcast on AM frequency 1560 kHz: 1560 AM is classified as a United States clear-channel frequency by the Federal Communications Commission. KNZR Bakersfield and WFME New York City share Class A status of 1560 kHz.

Argentina
 LT 33 in 9 de Julio, Buenos Aires
 LT 11 in Concepción del Uruguay, Entre Rios
 Castañares in Ituzaingó
 La Voz in Tandil, Buenos Aires
 Restauración in Lavallol, Buenos Aires

Mexico
 XEJPV-AM in Ciudad Juárez, Chihuahua
 XEMAS-AM in Salamanca, Guanajuato

United States
Stations in bold are clear-channel stations.

References

Lists of radio stations by frequency